Ruslan Biktyakov (born 16 February 1974) is a Uzbekistani wrestler. He competed in the men's Greco-Roman 69 kg at the 2000 Summer Olympics. He was affiliated with Spartak Tashkent.

References

1974 births
Living people
Uzbekistani male sport wrestlers
Olympic wrestlers of Uzbekistan
Wrestlers at the 2000 Summer Olympics
Place of birth missing (living people)
Wrestlers at the 2002 Asian Games
Asian Games competitors for Uzbekistan
Spartak athletes
21st-century Uzbekistani people